Conquering South America is the first live album by Florida death metal band Malevolent Creation.

Track listing

Personnel
 Kyle Symons - Vocals
 Phil Fasciana - Rhythm guitar
 Rob Barrett - Lead guitar
 Gordon Simms - Bass guitar
 Tony Laureano - Drums

Malevolent Creation live albums
2004 live albums